was a village located in Higashiusuki District, Miyazaki Prefecture, Japan.

As of 2003, the village had an estimated population of 2,718 and the density of 19.65 persons per km². The total area was 138.32 km².

On January 1, 2006, Saigō, along with the villages of Kitagō and Nangō (all from Higashiusuki District), was merged to create the town of Misato and no longer exists as an independent municipality.

Saigo literally means "west shire". This village was a western quarter of so-called Irigo (literally Inlands Shire) area.

History
The village was established in 1889 by merging the villages (now hamlets) of Obaru, Tashiro, Tateishi and Yamasanga.

External links
 Official website of Misato  
 Official website of Saigō 

Dissolved municipalities of Miyazaki Prefecture